Uproar in Damascus (German: Aufruhr in Damaskus) is a 1939 German thriller film directed by Gustav Ucicky and starring Brigitte Horney, Joachim Gottschalk and Hans Nielsen. It is set during the First World War with German troops battling the Arab Revolt led by Lawrence of Arabia and the British. The film was officially honored as "artistically valuable" (künstlerisch wertvoll) and having "special political value" (staatspolitisch wertvoll).

It was made at the Marienfelde Studios in Berlin with extensive location shooting in Italian-ruled Libya, particularly around the capital Tripoli. The film's sets were designed by the art directors Karl Böhm and Erich Czerwonski.

Cast

References

External links

Films of Nazi Germany
1930s war films
1939 adventure films
German war films
German adventure films
Films directed by Gustav Ucicky
Films set in Syria
Films set in 1918
German World War I films
Nazi propaganda films
World War I films set in the Middle East
German black-and-white films
German thriller films
Films set in the Ottoman Empire
Terra Film films
1930s thriller films
Films shot in Libya
1930s German films
Films shot at Terra Studios